The Mercedes-Benz M103 is a straight-6 15 degrees, crossflow cylinder head with an inclination to the right, automobile engine produced from 1984 to 1997. It is a single overhead cam design with 2 valves per cylinder. The M103 was replaced by the M104 starting in 1989. The bore spacing on the M103 engine is 97 mm. This engine received several updates over the years of production, one of the updates was a change from a spherical combustion chamber to a "heart shaped" combustion chamber.

3.0 L
The 103.980 engine of  uses the CIS-E (Continuous Injection System - Electronic).

Specifications
 Engine power @ 5700 rpm:  with catalyst,  without catalyst
 Torque @ 4400 rpm:  (with catalyst),  without catalyst
 Bore and stroke: 
 Compression ratio: 9.2:1 
 Redline: 6200 rpm
 Firing order: 1-5-3-6-2-4
 Lubrication system: pressure circulation
 Oil capacity: 
 Coolant capacity: 
 Number of valves: 1 intake, 1 exhaust with V-shaped overhead configuration
 Valve operation: 1 top camshaft. 
 Camshaft drive: simple roller-type chain
 Starter motor: 1.5 kW electrical motor; since Jan 1988: 1.7 kW
 Ignition system: electronic ignition system. 
 Recommended fuel octane: 91 RON/MON (96 RON) (86 MON). 

This engine can be found in the W124 (300E), W126 (300SE / 300SEL), R107 (300SL), R129 (300SL), W463 (300GE), and Isdera Spyder 036i.

2.6 L
The smaller 103.940 engine of  also used the CIS-E engine management system.

Specifications
 Engine power @ 5800 rpm:  with catalyst,  without catalyst
 Torque @ 4600 rpm:  with catalyst,  without catalyst.
 Bore and stroke: 
 Compression ratio: 9.2:1 
 Redline: 6200 rpm
 Firing order: 1-5-3-6-2-4
 Lubrication system: pressure circulation
 Oil capacity: 
 Coolant capacity: 
 Camshaft drive: simple roller-type chain
 Number of valves: 1 intake, 1 exhaust with V-shaped overhead configuration
 Valve operation: 1 top camshaft
 Starter motor: 1.5 kW electrical motor; since Jan 1988: 1.7 kW
 Ignition system: electronic ignition system. 

The only mechanical differences from the M103 3.0 L to the M103 2.6 L were the smaller bore and intake valves, with a slightly different airbox. The CIS-E components between 2.6 and 3.0 variants are all shared for any given model year with the exception of the ECU making engine swaps from 2.6 to 3.0 virtually bolt-in.

This engine can be found in the W201 (190E 2.6), W124 (260E / 300E 2.6) and W126 (260SE).

M103
Straight-six engines